Georgia State Route 24 Business may refer to:

 Georgia State Route 24 Business (Eatonton): a business route of State Route 24 that exists entirely within the city limits of Eatonton
 Georgia State Route 24 Business (Watkinsville): a business route of State Route 24 that exists mostly within the city limits of Watkinsville

024 Business